VIS Idoli is a collection of four albums by Yugoslav new wave band Idoli. The albums included in the set are:

 1981 VIS Idoli (with the "Maljčiki" / "Retko te viđam sa devojkama" single as bonus tracks)
 1982 Odbrana i poslednji dani
 1983 Čokolada
 1985 Šest dana juna

They are all released with the same track listing and design as the original albums except for the VIS Idoli EP which features the band's second single as bonus tracks.

External links 
 VIS Idoli Box Set at the Croatia Records official site

Idoli albums
2007 compilation albums
Serbian-language albums